Amaziah of Judah (pronounced , ;), was the ninth king of Judah and the son and successor of Joash. His mother was Jehoaddan and his son was Uzziah. He took the throne at the age of 25, after the assassination of his father, and reigned for 29 years,, 24 years of which were with the co-regency of his son. The second Book of Kings and the second Book of Chronicles in the Hebrew Bible consider him a righteous king, but with some hesitation. He is praised for killing the assassins of his father only and sparing their children, as dictated by the Mosaic Law.

Edwin R. Thiele dates Amaziah's reign from 797/796 to 768/767 BCE. Thiele's chronology has his son Uzziah becoming co-regent with him in the fifth year of his reign, in 792/791 BCE, when Uzziah was 16 years old.

Reign

As soon as his kingdom was established, Amaziah executed the murderers of his father, but he permitted their children to live in obedience to the Mosaic law:
Fathers shall not be put to death for their children, nor shall children be put to death for their fathers; a person shall be put to death for his own sin.

Amaziah was the first to employ a mercenary army, 100,000 Israelite soldiers, who he engaged in an attempt to reconquer Edom, which had rebelled during the reign of Jehoram, his great-grandfather. He was commanded by an unnamed prophet to send back the mercenaries, with whom he acquiesced (13), much to the annoyance of the mercenaries. His obedience to this command was followed by a decisive victory over the Edomites.

Due to the Israelite mercenaries' anger at being excluded from the battle, they attacked and looted multiple towns in Judah. Afterward, Amaziah began to worship some of the idols he took from the Edomites. An unnamed prophet rebuked him for this, and the king responded by threatening him that if he continued to admonish him, he would have him executed. His victory over Edom inflated his pride, and he challenged to a combat Jehoash, grandson of Jehu, king of Israel. The latter's disdain and scorn for Amaziah are embodied in the stinging parable of the thistle and the cedar. In his resentment, Amaziah rushed into a disastrous battle at Beth-shemesh, and a humiliating defeat overtook his army and the land. The king was captured, 400 cubits of the wall of Jerusalem was broken down, the city, Temple, and palace were looted, and hostages were carried to Samaria.

His defeat was followed by a conspiracy which took his life. He, like his father, was the victim of assassins, apparently bent upon killing the one who had brought upon such dire disasters upon the land. Amaziah was slain at Lachish, to which he had fled, and his body was brought to Jerusalem, where it was buried in the royal sepulcher. While the narrative in 2 Kings records the conspiracy "in fact only", the Chronicler "characteristically connects the conspiracy with Amaziah’s apostasy", which took place "after the time that" (and by implication, because) "Amaziah turned away from following the Lord".

The rabbis of the Talmud declared, based upon a rabbinic tradition, that Prophet Amoz was the brother of Amaziah (אמציה), the king of Judah at that time (and, as a result, that Prophet Isaiah himself was a member of the royal family).

Biblical evaluation
According to the Books of Kings, Amaziah "did what was right in the sight of the Lord", but did not meet the standard of righteousness set by King David; in particular, because he did not remove the local shrines on the "high places" and centralise worship in Jerusalem. The writer of the Books of Chronicles also considers that during the earlier part of his reign, "he did what was right in the sight of the Lord, but not with a loyal heart".

Biblical scholar H. P. Mathys notes that , verses which deals with Amaziah's discharge of the mercenary army, are "often regarded as having stemmed from an independent source available to the Chronicler, since they do not conform with his theology.

Chronological notes
The calendars for reckoning the years of kings in Judah and Israel were offset by six months, that of Judah starting in Tishri (in the fall) and that of Israel in Nisan (in the spring). Cross-synchronizations between the two kingdoms therefore often allow narrowing of the beginning and/or ending dates of a king to within a six-month range. For Amaziah, the Scriptural data allow the narrowing of his accession to some time between Nisan 1 of 796 BCE and the day before Tishri 1 of the same BCE year. For calculation purposes, this should be taken as the Judean year beginning in Tishri of 797/796 BC, or more simply 797 BCE. His death occurred at some time between Nisan 1 and Tishri 1 of 767 BCE, i.e. in 768/767 by Judean reckoning, or more simply 768 BCE.

References

9th-century BC births
8th-century BC murdered monarchs
8th-century BC Kings of Judah
Prisoners of war
8th-century BC deaths
Biblical murder victims
Ancient child monarchs
Male murder victims